Meneuztamak (Mänäweztamaq) is a rural locality (a selo) and the administrative centre of Meneuztamaksky Selsoviet, Miyakinsky District, Bashkortostan, Russia. The population was 878 as of 2010. There are 12 streets.

Geography 
Meneuztamak is located 28 km northwest of Kirgiz-Miyaki (the district's administrative centre) by road. Novomikhaylovka is the nearest rural locality.

References 

Rural localities in Miyakinsky District